Peter Clowe Hughes  (20 May 1922 – 5 February 2019) was an English actor with a career spanning five decades. He was an actor, founder and director of theatre, but was best known for his film and television roles.

Early life and theatre
Hughes was born in Kensal Rise, London, an only child of a single mother. He was partly raised in foster institutions, and initially trained as a draughtsman designing car chassis, before moving to Coventry after his mother died in 1939 where he took a post designing armoured cars.

After helping establish the Talisman Theatre in 1942, he trained as an actor, making his professional debut in 1949, in a production of Noël Coward's Fallen Angels. His West End debut would occur four years later in 1953, after which he would establish a long association with both the Richmond Theatre and the Watford Palace Theatre.

Film and television
In television, Hughes would play the recurring role of a bank manager in the BBC series Bergerac.

Other notable roles include an English tourist in Love Is a Splendid Illusion (1970). He appeared in An Englishman's Castle in 1978, a serial of alternative history in which the Nazis have won the Second World War. Another appearance in 1978 was as the underworld crime boss William Henry (Bill) Hayden in an episode of the hard-hitting British police drama The Professionals, the episode entitled When the Heat Cools Off.

Hughes also featured as a maitre d' in The Great Muppet Caper (1981); the P&O manager in David Lean's A Passage to India (1984) and a policeman in the John Boorman film Hope and Glory (1987).

TV miniseries included Jack the Ripper (1988) starring Michael Caine in which Hughes played Mr. Poulson, the proprietor of a news agency. He played General Franco in Alan Parker's film adaptation of Evita in 1996.

Personal life 
Hughes and his wife Erica were the parents of historian Bettany and Simon, a cricketer and journalist. He retired in 1999 and died in February 2019 at the age of 96.

Filmography

References

External links

1922 births
2019 deaths
English male film actors
English male television actors